Xie He may refer to:

 Xie He (Chinese artist), an ancient Chinese painter and art theorist in the 6th century
 Xie He (Go player), a modern Chinese professional Go player